The 8th IAAF World Half Marathon Championships was held on October 3, 1999, in the city of Palermo, Italy. A total of 192 athletes, 119 men and 73 women, from 48 countries, took part.
The course was traced through the historical centre of the town with the start/finish line on the "Foro Italico."  A detailed report on the event and an appraisal of the results were given.

Complete results were published.

Medallists

Race results

Men's

Women's

(1:09:26), but tested positive for nandrolone and disqualified.

Team results

Men's

Women's

Participation
The participation of 192 athletes (119 men/73 women) from 48 countries is reported.

 (5)
 (4)
 (3)
 (5)
 (4)
 (1)
 (1)
 (1)
 (6)
 (1)
 (2)
 (1)
 (3)
 (3)
 (10)
 (7)
 (4)
 (2)
 (1)
 (1)
 (10)
 (10)
 (10)
 (3)
 (1)
 (1)
 (4)
 (3)
 (2)
 (2)
 (2)
 (5)
 (5)
 (5)
 (2)
 (2)
 (10)
 (7)
 (3)
 (3)
 (1)
 (3)
 (3)
 (7)
 (10)
 (5)
 (3)
 (4)

See also
1999 in athletics (track and field)

References

External links
Official website

IAAF World Half Marathon Championships
Half Marathon Championships
World Athletics Half Marathon Championships
International athletics competitions hosted by Italy